Fernardino may refer to:
the  Fernandino peoples of Equatorial Guinea
a group of Mission Indians in Southern California (Fernandeňos, in Spanish) from their association with the Mission San Fernando Rey de España